A constructed language (often called a conlang) is a language whose phonology, grammar, and vocabulary, instead of having developed naturally, are consciously devised for some purpose, which may include being devised for a work of fiction. A constructed language may also be referred to as an artificial, planned or invented language, or (in some cases) a fictional language. Planned languages (or engineered languages/engelangs) are languages that have been purposefully designed; they are the result of deliberate, controlling intervention and are thus of a form of language planning.

There are many possible reasons to create a constructed language, such as to ease human communication (see international auxiliary language and code); to give fiction or an associated constructed setting an added layer of realism; for experimentation in the fields of linguistics, cognitive science, and machine learning; for artistic creation; and for language games. Some people may also make constructed languages as a hobby.

The expression planned language is sometimes used to indicate international auxiliary languages and other languages designed for actual use in human communication. Some prefer it to the adjective artificial, as this term may be perceived as pejorative. Outside Esperanto culture, the term language planning means the prescriptions given to a natural language to standardize it; in this regard, even a "natural language" may be artificial in some respects, meaning some of its words have been crafted by conscious decision. Prescriptive grammars, which date to ancient times for classical languages such as Latin and Sanskrit, are rule-based codifications of natural languages, such codifications being a middle ground between naïve natural selection and development of language and its explicit construction. The term glossopoeia  is also used to mean language construction, particularly construction of artistic languages.

Conlang speakers are rare. For example, the Hungarian census of 2011 found 8,397 speakers of Esperanto, and the census of 2001 found 10 of Romanid, two each of Interlingua and Ido and one each of Idiom Neutral and Mundolinco. The Russian census of 2010 found that there were in Russia about 992 speakers of Esperanto (on place 120) and nine of the Esperantido Ido.

Planned, constructed, artificial
The terms "planned", "constructed", and "artificial" are used differently in some traditions. For example, few speakers of Interlingua consider their language artificial, since they assert that it has no invented content: Interlingua's vocabulary is taken from a small set of natural languages, and its grammar is based closely on these source languages, even including some degree of irregularity; its proponents prefer to describe its vocabulary and grammar as standardized rather than artificial or constructed. Similarly, Latino sine flexione (LsF) is a simplification of Latin from which the inflections have been removed. As with Interlingua, some prefer to describe its development as "planning" rather than "constructing". Some speakers of Esperanto and Esperantidoj also avoid the term "artificial language" because they deny that there is anything "unnatural" about the use of their language in human communication.

By contrast, some philosophers have argued that all human languages are conventional or artificial. François Rabelais's fictional giant Pantagruel, for instance, said: "It is a misuse of terms to say that we have natural language; languages exist through arbitrary institutions and the conventions of peoples. Voices, as the dialecticians say, don't signify naturally, but capriciously."

Furthermore, fictional or experimental languages can be considered naturalistic if they model real world languages. For example, if a naturalistic conlang is derived a posteriori from another language (real or constructed), it should imitate natural processes of phonological, lexical, and grammatical change. In contrast with languages such as Interlingua, naturalistic fictional languages are not usually intended for easy learning or communication. Thus, naturalistic fictional languages tend to be more difficult and complex. While Interlingua has simpler grammar, syntax, and orthography than its source languages (though more complex and irregular than Esperanto or its descendants), naturalistic fictional languages typically mimic behaviors of natural languages like irregular verbs and nouns, and complicated phonological processes.

Overview

In terms of purpose, most constructed languages can broadly be divided into:

Engineered languages (engelangs ), further subdivided into logical languages (loglangs), philosophical languages and experimental languages, devised for experimentation in logic, philosophy, or linguistics;
Auxiliary languages (auxlangs) or IALs (for International Auxiliary Languages), devised for interlinguistic or international communication;
Artistic languages (artlangs), devised to create aesthetic pleasure or humorous effect (secret languages and mystical languages are also usually classified as artlangs).

The boundaries between these categories are by no means clear. A constructed language could easily fall into more than one of the above categories. A logical language created for aesthetic reasons would also be classifiable as an artistic language; one created with philosophical motives could include being used as an auxiliary language. There are no rules, either inherent in the process of language construction or externally imposed, that would limit a constructed language to fitting only one of the above categories.

A constructed language can have native speakers if young children learn it from parents who speak it fluently. According to Ethnologue, there are "200–2000 who speak Esperanto as a first language". A member of the Klingon Language Institute, d'Armond Speers, attempted to raise his son as a native (bilingual with English) Klingon speaker.

As soon as a constructed language has a community of fluent speakers, especially if it has numerous native speakers, it begins to evolve and hence loses its constructed status. For example, Modern Hebrew and its pronunciation norms were developed from existing traditions of Hebrew, such as Mishnaic Hebrew and Biblical Hebrew following a general Sephardic pronunciation, rather than engineered from scratch, and has undergone considerable changes since the state of Israel was founded in 1948 (Hetzron 1990:693). However, linguist Ghil'ad Zuckermann argues that Modern Hebrew, which he terms "Israeli", is a Semito-European hybrid based not only on Hebrew but also on Yiddish and other languages spoken by revivalists. Zuckermann therefore endorses the translation of the Hebrew Bible into what he calls "Israeli". Esperanto as a living spoken language has evolved significantly from the prescriptive blueprint published in 1887, so that modern editions of the Fundamenta Krestomatio, a 1903 collection of early texts in the language, require many footnotes on the syntactic and lexical differences between early and modern Esperanto.

Proponents of constructed languages often have many reasons for using them. The famous but disputed Sapir–Whorf hypothesis is sometimes cited; this claims that the language one speaks influences the way one thinks. Thus, a "better" language should allow the speaker to think more clearly or intelligently or to encompass more points of view; this was the intention of Suzette Haden Elgin in creating Láadan, a feminist language embodied in her feminist science fiction series Native Tongue. Constructed languages have been included in standardized tests such as the SAT, where they were used to test the applicant's ability to infer and apply grammatical rules. By the same token, a constructed language might also be used to restrict thought, as in George Orwell's Newspeak, or to simplify thought, as in Toki Pona. However, linguists such as Steven Pinker argue that ideas exist independently of language. For example, in the book The Language Instinct, Pinker states that children spontaneously re-invent slang and even grammar with each generation. These linguists argue that attempts to control the range of human thought through the reform of language would fail, as concepts like "freedom" will reappear in new words if the old words vanish.

Proponents claim a particular language makes it easier to express and understand concepts in one area, and more difficult in others. An example can be taken from the way various programming languages make it easier to write certain kinds of programs and harder to write others.

Another reason cited for using a constructed language is the telescope rule, which claims that it takes less time to first learn a simple constructed language and then a natural language, than to learn only a natural language. Thus, if someone wants to learn English, some suggest learning Basic English first. Constructed languages like Esperanto and Interlingua are in fact often simpler due to the typical lack of irregular verbs and other grammatical quirks. Some studies have found that learning Esperanto helps in learning a non-constructed language later (see propaedeutic value of Esperanto).

Codes for constructed languages include the ISO 639-2 "art" for conlangs; however, some constructed languages have their own ISO 639 language codes (e.g. "eo" and "epo" for Esperanto, "jbo" for Lojban, "ia" and "ina" for Interlingua, "tlh" for Klingon, "io" and "ido" for Ido, "lfn" for Lingua Franca Nova, and "tok" for Toki Pona).

One constraint on a constructed language is that if it was constructed to be a natural language for use by fictional foreigners or aliens, as with Dothraki and High Valyrian in the Game of Thrones series, which was adapted from the A Song of Ice and Fire book series, the language should be easily pronounced by actors, and should fit with and incorporate any fragments of the language already invented by the book's author, and preferably also fit with any personal names of fictional speakers of the language.

A priori and a posteriori languages

An a priori constructed language is one whose features (including vocabulary, grammar, etc.) are not based on an existing language, and an a posteriori language is the opposite. This categorization, however, is not absolute, as many constructed languages may be called a priori when considering some linguistic factors, and at the same time a posteriori when considering other factors.

A priori language

An a priori language (from Latin a priori, "from the former") is any constructed language of which all or a number of features are not based on existing languages, but rather invented or elaborated so as to work in a different way or to allude to different purposes. Some a priori languages are designed to be international auxiliary languages that remove what could be considered an unfair learning advantage for native speakers of a source language that would otherwise exist for a posteriori languages. Others, known as philosophical or taxonomic languages, try to categorize their vocabulary, either to express an underlying philosophy or to make it easier to recognize new vocabulary. Finally, many artistic languages, created for either personal use or for use in a fictional medium, employ consciously constructed grammars and vocabularies, and are best understood as a priori.

Examples of a priori languages

A priori international auxiliary languages
 Balaibalan, attributed to Fazlallah Astarabadi or Muhyi Gulshani (14th century)
 Solresol by François Sudre (1827)
 Ro by Edward Foster (1906)
 Sona by Kenneth Searight (1935)
 Babm by Rikichi Okamoto (1962)
 Kotava by Staren Fetcey (1978)
  Mirad (aka Unilingua) by Noubar Agopoff (1966)

Experimental languages
 Láadan by Suzette Haden Elgin (1982)
 Ithkuil by John Quijada (2011)

A priori artistic languages
 Quenya and Sindarin by J. R. R. Tolkien for The Lord of the Rings (published 1954)
 aUI by W. John Weilgart (1962)
 Klingon by Marc Okrand for the science-fiction franchise Star Trek (1985)
 Kēlen by Sylvia Sotomayor (1998)
 Naʼvi by Paul Frommer for the movie Avatar (2009)
 Dothraki and Valyrian by David Peterson for the television series Game of Thrones (2011)
 Kiliki by Madhan Karky for the Baahubali films (2015)

Community languages
 Damin (Yangkaal and Lardil people, 19th century or earlier)
 Eskayan (Eskaya, ca. 1920)
 Medefaidrin (Ibibio, 1930s)
 Palawa kani (Palawa, 1990s)

A posteriori language
An a posteriori language (from Latin a posteriori, "from the latter"), according to French linguist Louis Couturat, is any constructed language whose elements are borrowed from or based on existing languages. The term can also be extended to controlled versions of natural languages, and is most commonly used to refer to vocabulary despite other features. Likewise, zonal auxiliary languages (auxiliary languages for speakers of a particular language family) are a posteriori by definition.

While most auxiliary languages are a posteriori due to their intended function as a medium of communication, many artistic languages are fully a posteriori in design—many for the purposes of alternate history. In distinguishing whether the language is a priori or a posteriori, the prevalence and distribution of respectable traits is often the key.

Examples of a posteriori languages

A posteriori artistic languages
 Brithenig by Andrew Smith (1996)
 Atlantean by Marc Okrand for the film Atlantis: The Lost Empire (2001)
 Toki Pona by Sonja Lang (2001)
 Wenedyk by Jan van Steenbergen (2002)
 Trigedasleng by David Peterson for the TV series The 100 (2014)

Controlled auxiliary languages
 Latino sine flexione (Latin, 1911)
 Basic English (English, 1925)
 N'Ko (Manding, 1949)
 Learning English (English, 1959)
 Kitara (SW Ugandan Bantu, 1990)
 Globish (English, 2004)

A posteriori international auxiliary languages
 (1868) Universalglot
 (1879) Volapük
 (1887) Esperanto
 (1902) Idiom Neutral
 (1907) Ido
 (1922) Interlingue
 (1928) Novial
 (1951) Interlingua
 (1965) Lingua Franca Nova
 (1970) Afrihili
 (ca. 1979) Glosa
 (1986) Uropi
 (2007) Sambahsa
 (2010) Lingwa de planeta

Zonal auxiliary languages

 Efatese (C. Vanuatu Oceanic, 19th century)
 Romanid (Romance, 1956)
 Folkspraak (Germanic, 1995)
 Budinos (Finno-Ugric, 2000s)
 Interslavic (Slavic, 2011)
 Palawa kani (Aboriginal Australian, 1992)

History

Ancient linguistic experiments
Grammatical speculation dates from Classical Antiquity, appearing for instance in Plato's Cratylus in Hermogenes's contention that words are not inherently linked to what they refer to; that people apply "a piece of their own voice ... to the thing".

Athenaeus tells the story of two figures: Dionysius of Sicily and Alexarchus:

 Dionysius of Sicily created neologisms like menandros "virgin" (from menei "waiting" and andra "husband") for standard Greek parthenos; menekratēs "pillar" (from menei "it remains in one place" and kratei "it is strong") for standard stulos; and ballantion "javelin" (from balletai enantion "thrown against someone") for standard akon.

 Alexarchus of Macedon, the brother of King Cassander of Macedon, was the founder of the city of Ouranopolis. Athenaeus recounts a story told by Heracleides of Lembos that Alexarchus "introduced a peculiar vocabulary, referring to a rooster as a "dawn-crier", a barber as a "mortal-shaver", a drachma as "worked silver", ... and a herald as an aputēs [from ēputa "loud-voiced"].

"He [Alexarchus] once wrote something ... to the public authorities in Casandreia ... As for what this letter says, in my opinion not even the Pythian god could make sense of it."

While the mechanisms of grammar suggested by classical philosophers were designed to explain existing languages (Latin, Greek, and Sanskrit), they were not used to construct new grammars. Roughly contemporary to Plato, in his descriptive grammar of Sanskrit, Pāṇini constructed a set of rules for explaining language, so that the text of his grammar may be considered a mixture of natural and constructed language.

Early constructed languages

A legend recorded in the seventh-century Irish work Auraicept na n-Éces claims that Fénius Farsaid visited Shinar after the confusion of tongues, and he and his scholars studied the various languages for ten years, taking the best features of each to create in Bérla tóbaide ("the selected language"), which he named Goídelc—the Irish language. This appears to be the first mention of the concept of a constructed language in literature.

The earliest non-natural languages were considered less "constructed" than "super-natural", mystical, or divinely inspired. The Lingua Ignota, recorded in the 12th century by St. Hildegard of Bingen, is an example, and apparently the first entirely artificial language. It is a form of private mystical cant (see also Enochian). An important example from Middle-Eastern culture is Balaibalan, invented in the 16th century. Kabbalistic grammatical speculation was directed at recovering the original language spoken by Adam and Eve in Paradise, lost in the confusion of tongues. The first Christian project for an ideal language is outlined in Dante Alighieri's De vulgari eloquentia, where he searches for the ideal Italian vernacular suited for literature. Ramon Llull's Ars Magna was a project of a perfect language with which the infidels could be convinced of the truth of the Christian faith. It was basically an application of combinatorics on a given set of concepts. During the Renaissance, Lullian and Kabbalistic ideas were drawn upon in a magical context, resulting in cryptographic applications.

Perfecting language
Renaissance interest in Ancient Egypt, notably the discovery of the Hieroglyphica of Horapollo, and first encounters with the Chinese script directed efforts towards a perfect written language. Johannes Trithemius, in Steganographia and Polygraphia, attempted to show how all languages can be reduced to one. In the 17th century, interest in magical languages was continued by the Rosicrucians and alchemists (like John Dee and his Enochian). Jakob Boehme in 1623 spoke of a "natural language" (Natursprache) of the senses.

Musical languages from the Renaissance were tied up with mysticism, magic and alchemy, sometimes also referred to as the language of the birds. The Solresol project of 1817 re-invented the concept in a more pragmatic context.

17th and 18th century: advent of philosophical languages
The 17th century saw the rise of projects for "philosophical" or "a priori" languages, such as:

Francis Lodwick's A Common Writing (1647) and The Groundwork or Foundation laid (or So Intended) for the Framing of a New Perfect Language and a Universal Common Writing (1652)
 Sir Thomas Urquhart's Ekskybalauron (1651) and Logopandecteision (1652)
 George Dalgarno's Ars signorum, 1661
 John Wilkins' Essay towards a Real Character, and a Philosophical Language, 1668

These early taxonomic conlangs produced systems of hierarchical classification that were intended to result in both spoken and written expression. Leibniz had a similar purpose for his lingua generalis of 1678, aiming at a lexicon of characters upon which the user might perform calculations that would yield true propositions automatically, as a side-effect developing binary calculus. These projects were not only occupied with reducing or modelling grammar, but also with the arrangement of all human knowledge into "characters" or hierarchies, an idea that with the Enlightenment would ultimately lead to the Encyclopédie. Many of these 17th–18th centuries conlangs were pasigraphies, or purely written languages with no spoken form or a spoken form that would vary greatly according to the native language of the reader.

Leibniz and the encyclopedists realized that it is impossible to organize human knowledge unequivocally in a tree diagram, and consequently to construct an a priori language based on such a classification of concepts. Under the entry Charactère, D'Alembert critically reviewed the projects of philosophical languages of the preceding century. After the Encyclopédie, projects for a priori languages moved more and more to the lunatic fringe. Individual authors, typically unaware of the history of the idea, continued to propose taxonomic philosophical languages until the early 20th century (e.g. Ro), but most recent engineered languages have had more modest goals; some are limited to a specific field, like mathematical formalism or calculus (e.g. Lincos and programming languages), others are designed for eliminating syntactical ambiguity (e.g., Loglan and Lojban) or maximizing conciseness (e.g., Ithkuil).

19th and 20th centuries: auxiliary languages

Already in the Encyclopédie attention began to focus on a posteriori auxiliary languages. Joachim Faiguet de Villeneuve in the article on Langue wrote a short proposition of a "laconic" or regularized grammar of French. During the 19th century, a bewildering variety of such International Auxiliary Languages (IALs) were proposed, so that Louis Couturat and Léopold Leau in Histoire de la langue universelle (1903) reviewed 38 projects.

The first of these that made any international impact was Volapük, proposed in 1879 by Johann Martin Schleyer; within a decade, 283 Volapükist clubs were counted all over the globe. However, disagreements between Schleyer and some prominent users of the language led to schism, and by the mid-1890s it fell into obscurity, making way for Esperanto, proposed in 1887 by L. L. Zamenhof, and its descendants. Interlingua, the most recent auxlang to gain a significant number of speakers, emerged in 1951, when the International Auxiliary Language Association published its Interlingua–English Dictionary and an accompanying grammar. The success of Esperanto did not stop others from trying to construct new auxiliary languages, such as Leslie Jones' Eurolengo, which mixes elements of English and Spanish.

Loglan (1955) and its descendants constitute a pragmatic return to the aims of the a priori languages, tempered by the requirement of usability of an auxiliary language. Thus far, these modern a priori languages have garnered only small groups of speakers.

Robot Interaction Language (2010) is a spoken language that is optimized for communication between machines and humans. The major goals of ROILA are that it should be easily learnable by the human user, and optimized for efficient recognition by computer speech recognition algorithms.

Artlangs

Artists may use language as a source of creativity in art, poetry, or calligraphy, or as a metaphor to address themes as cultural diversity and the vulnerability of the individual in a globalized world.

Some people prefer however to take pleasure in constructing, crafting a language by a conscious decision for reasons of literary enjoyment or aesthetic reasons without any claim of usefulness. Such artistic languages begin to appear in Early Modern literature (in Pantagruel, and in Utopian contexts), but they only seem to gain notability as serious projects beginning in the 20th century. A Princess of Mars (1912) by Edgar Rice Burroughs was possibly the first fiction of that century to feature a constructed language. J. R. R. Tolkien developed families of related fictional languages and discussed artistic languages publicly, giving a lecture entitled "A Secret Vice" in 1931 at a congress. (Orwell's Newspeak is considered a satire of an international auxiliary language rather than an artistic language proper.)

By the beginning of the first decade of the 21st century, it had become common for science-fiction and fantasy works set in other worlds to feature constructed languages, or more commonly, an extremely limited but defined vocabulary which suggests the existence of a complete language, or whatever portions of the language are needed for the story, and constructed languages are a regular part of the genre, appearing in Star Wars, Star Trek, The Lord of the Rings (Elvish), Stargate SG-1, Atlantis: The Lost Empire, Game of Thrones (Dothraki language and Valyrian languages), The Expanse, Avatar, Dune and the Myst series of computer adventure games.

Ownership of constructed languages

The matter of whether or not a constructed language can be owned or protected by intellectual property laws, or if it would even be possible to enforce those laws, is contentious.

In a 2015 lawsuit, CBS and Paramount Pictures challenged a fan film project called Axanar, stating the project infringed upon their intellectual property, which included the Klingon language, among other creative elements. During the controversy, Marc Okrand, the language's original designer expressed doubt as to whether Paramount's claims of ownership were valid.

David J. Peterson, a linguist who created multiple well-known constructed languages including the Valyrian languages and Dothraki, advocated a similar opinion, saying that "Theoretically, anyone can publish anything using any language I created, and, in my opinion, neither I nor anyone else should be able to do anything about it."

However, Peterson also expressed concern that the respective rights-holders—regardless of whether or not their ownership of the rights is legitimate—would be likely to sue individuals who publish material in said languages, especially if the author might profit from said material.

Furthermore, comprehensive learning material for such constructed languages as High Valyrian and Klingon has been published and made freely accessible on the language-learning platform Duolingo—but those courses are licensed by the respective copyright holders. Because only a few such disputes have occurred thus far, the legal consensus on ownership of languages remains uncertain.

The Tasmanian Aboriginal Center claims ownership of Palawa kani, an attempted composite reconstruction of up to a dozen extinct Tasmanian indigenous languages, and has asked Wikipedia to remove its page on the project. However, there is no current legal backing for the claim.

Modern conlang organizations
Various paper zines on constructed languages were published from the 1970s through the 1990s, such as Glossopoeic Quarterly, Taboo Jadoo, and The Journal of Planned Languages.
The Conlang Mailing List was founded in 1991, and later split off an AUXLANG mailing list dedicated to international auxiliary languages.  In the early to mid-1990s a few conlang-related zines were published as email or websites, such as Vortpunoj and Model Languages. The Conlang mailing list has developed a community of conlangers with its own customs, such as translation challenges and translation relays, and its own terminology. Sarah Higley reports from results of her surveys that the demographics of the Conlang list are primarily men from North America and western Europe, with a smaller number from Oceania, Asia, the Middle East, and South America, with an age range from thirteen to over sixty; the number of women participating has increased over time.

More recently founded online communities include the Zompist Bulletin Board (ZBB; since 2001) and the Conlanger Bulletin Board.  Discussion on these forums includes presentation of members' conlangs and feedback from other members, discussion of natural languages, whether particular conlang features have natural language precedents, and how interesting features of natural languages can be repurposed for conlangs, posting of interesting short texts as translation challenges, and meta-discussion about the philosophy of conlanging, conlangers' purposes, and whether conlanging is an art or a hobby.  Another 2001 survey by Patrick Jarrett showed an average age of 30.65, with the average time since starting to invent languages 11.83 years. A more recent thread on the ZBB showed that many conlangers spend a relatively small amount of time on any one conlang, moving from one project to another; about a third spend years on developing the same language.

See also

List of constructed languages
Interlinguistics
Aboriginal constructed languages: Damin, Eskayan
Idioglossia
Cant (language)
ISO, SIL, and BCP language codes for constructed languages
Language construction
Artificial script
Langmaker
Language Construction Kit
Language game
Language regulator
List of language inventors
Language modelling and translation
Knowledge representation
Language translation
Metalanguage
Universal grammar
Mystical languages
Glossolalia
Language of the birds
Spontaneous emergence of grammar
Artificial language
June and Jennifer Gibbons
Nicaraguan Sign Language
Origin of language
Pidgin
Poto and Cabengo
Linguistic determinism
Linguistic relativity
Pasigraphy
Universal language
Basic English

Notes

References

Couturat, Louis (1907). Les nouvelles langues internationales. Paris: Hachette. With Léopold Leau. Republished 2001, Olms.
Couturat, Louis (1910). Étude sur la dérivation dans la langue internationales.  Paris: Delagrave. 100 p.

"Babel's modern architects", by Amber Dance.  The Los Angeles Times, 24 August 2007 (Originally published as "In their own words -- literally")

External links

Language Creation Society, a nonprofit dedicated to all forms of language creation.

Conlang Atlas of Language Structures, a typological database of conlangs, based on the World Atlas of Language Structures.
Blueprints For Babel, focusing on international auxiliary languages.
ConWorkShop, a conlanging tools website, with documentation for over 5000 constructed languages.
Garrett's Links to Logical Languages
Department of Planned Languages Esperanto Museum of the Austrian National Library.
The Conlanger's Library
Henrik Theiling's (Con)Language Resources
Jörg Rhiemeier's Conlang Page
Create a sentence most people understand, by using common words between languages.

 
Interlinguistics
Language